Thomas Mervyn Davies  (9 December 1946 – 15 March 2012), often known as "Merv the Swerve", was a Welsh rugby union player who won 38 caps for Wales as a No. 8.

Early life
Davies was born in Swansea, where he attended Penlan County School. His father had played club rugby.

Rugby playing career
Tall and slight of frame, he grew a Mexican moustache to make himself appear more aggressive on the rugby field. He was nicknamed "Merv the Swerve".

Club rugby
Davies joined London Welsh in 1968, later moving to Swansea.

Wales and Lions international rugby
Davies won his first cap for Wales in 1969 against Scotland, going on to play 38 consecutive matches for Wales and scoring two tries. During this period Wales won two Grand Slams and three Triple Crowns. 

He went on the British and Irish Lions tours to New Zealand in 1971 and to South Africa in 1974, playing in all eight tests. Colin Meads said Davies was "the one player who probably had the biggest impact on that 1971 Lions Test series," particularly as he prevented NZ winning line out ball via Brian Lochore. Willie John McBride and Ian McLauchlan both said Davies was even better on the 1974 tour. Davies captained the Welsh side in 1975, when they won the five nations championship, and in 1976, achieving the 'Grand Slam'. Many expected Davies to captain the 1977 Lions. 

In a total of 46 international appearances for Wales and the Lions he only ended on the losing side nine times.

Appraisal

Davies key attributes were lineout play, ball handling skill (including offloading in tight situations), commitment, mental strength, and anticipation.

In 2001 Davies was inducted into the International Rugby Hall of Fame. In a poll of Welsh rugby fans in 2002, he was voted both Greatest Ever Welsh Captain and Greatest Ever Welsh Number 8.  Davies continues to be rated as one of the best No. 8s ever to have played the game.

Retirement
His career was ended by a subarachnoid hemorrhage suffered when captaining Swansea against Pontypool in 1976. He had collapsed during a game on another occasion, four years earlier, and had been wrongly diagnosed with meningitis. Following the second incident he was a patient in the University Hospital of Wales for several months, and received goodwill messages from all over the world.

He was a smoker and was diagnosed with lung cancer (adenocarcinoma) in November 2011. He died 4 months later.

Davies had a son and daughter by his first wife Shirley; the marriage ended in divorce. He is survived by his second wife Jeni and his three stepchildren, and by his two children from his first marriage.

Sources
Mervyn Davies & David Roach - In Strength and Shadow (Mainstream, 2005)
The Mervyn Davies Story (BBC2, September 2007)

References

1946 births
2012 deaths
Rugby union players from Swansea
Wales international rugby union players
Rugby union number eights
British & Irish Lions rugby union players from Wales
Wales rugby union captains
Swansea RFC players
London Welsh RFC players
Barbarian F.C. players
World Rugby Hall of Fame inductees
Deaths from lung cancer
Officers of the Order of the British Empire
Surrey RFU players
Deaths from cancer in Wales